NF-kappa-B inhibitor zeta (IκBζ) is a protein that in humans is encoded by the NFKBIZ gene.  This gene is a member of the ankyrin-repeat family and is induced by lipopolysaccharide (LPS). The C-terminal portion of the encoded product which contains the ankyrin repeats, shares high sequence similarity with the I kappa B family of proteins. The latter are known to play a role in inflammatory responses to LPS by their interaction with NF-B proteins through ankyrin-repeat domains. Studies in mouse indicate that this gene product is one of the nuclear I kappa B proteins and an activator of IL-6 production. Two transcript variants encoding different isoforms have been found for this gene.

Clinical relevance 
NFKBIZ has been implicated as an oncogene in diffuse large B-cell lymphoma (DLBCL). Specifically, genomic locus containing this gene is recurrently amplified in copy number in the activated B-cell (ABC) subgroup of DLBCL. More recently, a recurrence of somatic mutations affecting the 3-prime untranslated region of NFKBIZ were found to promote NFKBIZ expression in ABC DLBCL.

IκBζ is required for expression of the  SASP CCL2 (MCP1) cytokine, which recruits macrophages to remove cancer cells.

The flavonoid apigenin has been show to reduce gene expression of IκBζ.

References

Further reading